is a video game that was released in Japan in 1986.

In 1987, the game was re-released for the MSX2 under the title  with more detailed sprites and backgrounds. It also featured actual Seikima-II music.

Summary
The game is based on a then-popular Japanese heavy metal band formed by Damian Hamada called Seikima-II. This band lasted from its creation in 1982 to its dissolution on December 31, 1999. Their history, as it has been prophesied, is that they are a group of demons preaching a religion in order to propagate Satan through the use of Heavy Metal. Each member is a demon of a different hierarchical class with His Excellency Demon Kogure being leader of demons and His Majesty Damian Hamada being crown prince of hell. In accordance to the prophecy and after completing the world conquest, the band would disband at the end of the century on December 12, 1999 at 23:59:59 Japan Standard Time (09:59:99 Eastern Standard Time).

Character appearance

Demon Kogure
This is the player character. He is an NES globe-trotter who helps his fellows when they were caught by Zeus. If the player takes a hit with an enemy, he dies on the very first contact. The description of the player's death simply reads "The devil is not dead." 
Ace Shimizu 
One fellow that was caught in the name of Zeus. Coming in the fourth stage. He uses the Stratocaster guitar as an instrument. 
Jail O'Hashi 
Another fellow was caught in the name of Zeus. First appeared on stage. He uses the Flying V guitar as an instrument. 
Raiden Yuzawa 
Yet another fellow was caught in the name of Zeus. To appear in the second stage. His instrument is a basic set of drums. 
Xenon Ishikawa 
The fourth fellow that was caught in the name of Zeus. To appear in the third stage. His musical instrument is the simple bass guitar. 
Zeus 
In the final boss of the game, the enemy of the devil god demons appears to block progress towards beating it. He is named after the king of the Greek gods.

References

External links
Seikima II Akuma no Gyakushū! at MobyGames
Seikima II Akuma no Gyakushū! at Giant Bomb

1986 video games
1987 video games
Action video games
Band-centric video games
CBS Sony Group games
Japan-exclusive video games
MSX2 games
Nintendo Entertainment System games
Video games developed in Japan